Owe Rune Gustav Lostad (27 June 1922 – 12 October 2013) was a Swedish rowing coxswain. He competed in the coxed pairs, fours and eights at the 1960 Summer Olympics, but failed to reach the finals.

References

1922 births
2013 deaths
Swedish male rowers
Olympic rowers of Sweden
Rowers at the 1960 Summer Olympics
People from Jönköping
Sportspeople from Jönköping County